Lumberton High School is a high school in Lumberton, Texas.  It is operated by the Lumberton Independent School District.

History
The Lumberton Independent School District was created in 1967 from the Chance-Loeb school district that had previously been the school for children up to grade 8 in the area. The first high school was built in 1967 under direction of school board members Kenneth R. Kirkendall, Jim Stinson and Ross Iles. The school name was changed to Lumberton at that time. The high school is now home of the Lumberton Middle School, located on US Highway 96. The new high school, which opened in the fall of 1979, is located on Highway 69 on the west side of Lumberton. Located in the front of the school is a tree planted in memoriam of five students who died in a car crash in May 1998.

General
The school's official color is Columbia blue with secondary colors of red and silver. While the majority of organizations use red as the official color, in recent years, as in past, a trend has begun to revert to the original school color, Columbia blue. The mascot is the Raider, a representation of Yosemite Sam. The school is near the maximum enrollment for 4A Classifications (1,229), with over 1,100 students in 2018–2019.

Academics
For the 2018–2019 school year, Lumberton HS was given a Texas Academic Performance Report rating of "B" by the Texas Education Agency.

Teacher experience

Average class size

Extra curricular Programs

Student council
The Student Council is a member of the Texas Association of Student Councils.

Other academic and social groups 

Spanish Club
Health Occupational Students of America (HOSA)
LHS Republicans
Model United Nations
Debate and Speaking
Academic UIL
Future Farmers of America (FFA)
Yearbook
Interact Club
Key Club

Organizations

Band
Colorguard/Winterguard
Choir
Theatre
Lumberton Raiderettes
Cheerleaders
Baseball team
Softball team
Lady Raiders Soccer
Raider Soccer
Football
Tennis
Swimming
Golf
Fishing
Volleyball
Powerlifting
Cross Country
Track and Field

References

External links

Schools in Hardin County, Texas
Public high schools in Texas
1967 establishments in Texas
School districts established in 1967